Devonport Dockyard may refer to:
HMNB Devonport, Devonport, Devon, England, one of the main bases of the Royal Navy in the United Kingdom
Devonport Naval Base, Devonport, New Zealand, the main base of the Royal New Zealand Navy